Grzyby-Orzepy  is a village in the administrative district of Gmina Siemiatycze, within Siemiatycze County, Podlaskie Voivodeship, in north-eastern Poland.

References

Grzyby-Orzepy